Facundo Ignacio Diz (born April 16, 1979 in Navarro) is a retired Argentine footballer.

Career

South America
Diz began his career with Club Atlético All Boys in 1997, playing with the club for eight season. He spent brief loan spells in 2004 with Banfield as well as Venezuelan side Deportivo Táchira before returning to Argentina and All Boys for their 2005 campaign. Following a loan stint with Club Atlético San Telmo, Diz played the 2006–2008 seasons with Club Atlético Tigre. Following a six-month run with Olimpo de Bahía Blanca at the end of 2008, Diz caught on with Club Atlético Platense in 2009, where he scored nine goals in 15 games, helping the team avoid relegation.

North America
Diz signed with Major League Soccer club Colorado Rapids in July 2009, making his debut as a substitute in a 4-0 victory over New York Red Bulls on July 25, 2009. However, Diz was released by Colorado on March 9, 2010.

References

External links

1979 births
Living people
Argentine footballers
Argentine expatriate footballers
Association football forwards
Sportspeople from Buenos Aires Province
All Boys footballers
Club Atlético Banfield footballers
Club Atlético Tigre footballers
Olimpo footballers
Club Atlético Platense footballers
Deportivo Táchira F.C. players
Colorado Rapids players
Quilmes Atlético Club footballers
CSyD Tristán Suárez footballers
UAI Urquiza players
Sportivo Italiano footballers
Major League Soccer players
Argentine expatriate sportspeople in the United States
Argentine expatriate sportspeople in Venezuela
Expatriate footballers in Venezuela
Expatriate soccer players in the United States